The Kees Akerboom Trophy (in Dutch: Kees Akerboom Trofee) is an individual award that is yearly given to the player with the most three-point field goals made in the Dutch Basketball League (DBL) given since 2001. The award is handed out after the regular season. The award is named after Kees Akerboom, Sr.

Winners

Notes

References

Most Improved Player
Most improved awards